Admiral Sir Reginald John James George Macdonald  (19 October 1820 – 15 December 1899) was a Royal Navy officer who went on to be Commander-in-Chief, East Indies Station.

Early life
Macdonald was born in Westminster, the son of Reginald George MacDonald, chief of Clan Ranald, and Lady Caroline Anne Edgcumbe, daughter of Richard Edgcumbe, 2nd Earl of Mount Edgcumbe.

Naval career
Macdonald joined the Royal Navy in 1833. He served in the Eighth Xhosa War as Commander of HMS Ferret. Promoted to Captain in 1854, he commanded HMS Hogue, HMS Arethusa and then HMS Bellerophon. He was appointed Second-in-Command of the Channel Fleet in 1872 and from 1873 he became the 21st chief of the Clan Macdonald of Clanranald.

Promoted to rear-admiral, he was made Commander-in-Chief, East Indies Station with his flag in the armoured cruiser, in 1875 and Commander-in-Chief, The Nore in 1879. He retired in 1884.

Family
In 1855, he married Hon. Adelaide Louisa Warren Venables-Vernon, daughter of 5th Baron Vernon. They had two sons and two daughters:

Capt. Allan Douglas MacDonald (1856–1908), Chief of Clanranald
Angus Roderick MacDonald (1858–1944)
Adelaide Effrida MacDonald
Maud MacDonald

References

Further reading

External links
HMS Ferret (1840)

|-

1820 births
1899 deaths
Clan MacDonald of Clanranald
Royal Navy admirals
Knights Commander of the Order of the Bath
Knights Commander of the Order of the Star of India
Clanranald, Reginald Macdonald, 7th Baron